Veurne is a city and municipality in the Belgian province of West Flanders.

History

Origins up to the 15th century
Veurne, in Latin Furna, is first found in 877 as a possession of the Saint Bertin Abbey in Saint-Omer.  Around 890 AD, it was noted as a successful fortification against the Viking raids.  It soon was placed at the head of the castellany of Veurne, a large territory counting 42 parishes and some 8 half-independent parishes, owing allegiance to the Count of Flanders.  Veurne became a city in the 12th century.  During the following century, trade with England flourished.  In 1270, however, the relations with England came to a standstill and the city's economy went into a long decline; hence the nickname of the Veurne Sleepers.  On August 20, 1297, the Battle of Veurne was fought in the ongoing struggle between the Flemish cities and the French king.

The beautiful gothic church of Saint Walburga and the tower of the church of Saint Nicolas, date from that period. Saint Walburga housed a chapter of canons. Saint Nicholas and Saint Denis (gone 18th century) were the two other parish churches and possessions of the Norbertine abbey of Saint Nicholas.

15th century until the French Revolution

The 15th century saw the construction of a new city hall, which is known today as the Pavilion of the Spanish officers, from its use in the 17th century as military headquarters.  As most of the "Westhoek" (the Western part of the county of Flanders), the city and the neighbourghood strongly recessed during the economic and religious problems around 1566–1583. But when the town and the castellany officially got together, the town flourished, thanks to the expanding agriculture of the agrarian region.

Most of the other historic buildings date from this time, the prosperous reign of the Archdukes Albert and Isabella around 1600.

In 1644 the Capucines organised a procession. Since 1646, this procession was organised by the "Sodales", a religious confraternity, that organised a crossway during Advent time, under the leadership of the Norbertine monk Jacob Clou. The hooded "Sodales" took a cross for penitence. This procession was expanded at the end of the 17th century with scenes from the Bible, and is the only one of his kind, remaining up to now in Flanders.

The second half of the 17th century was marked by the miseries brought to the region by Louis XIV’s wars.  Vauban built heavy fortifications around the city, the outlines of which are still noticeable from the air today.  Joseph II of Austria put them down and closed some of the religious institutions, putting a temporary end to the penitents’ procession, until Leopold II of Austria allowed it again in 1790. Those few cloisters that were still operating were closed at the French Revolution.

19th and 20th century
From the Battle of Waterloo until World War I, Veurne could enjoy a century of quiet and prosperity.  In 1831, Veurne was the first city to welcome Belgium's new king, Leopold I, in his new country.

During World War I, Veurne was located within the Yser pocket of Belgian resistance against the German troops.  During the Battle of the Yser, the Veurne city hall became the headquarters for the Belgian troops under King Albert I and a military hospital was set up in the city.  In 1920, the French President, Raymond Poincaré, came to Veurne to award the city the Croix de guerre with palm.

Veurne suffered some damage during World War II, mainly from allied bombing but also from the strategic flooding that engulfed the whole area.  Today, the city is a regional centre, which gives commercial, medical, and educational services to the surrounding communities while enjoying increasing tourist attention.

Sights

Several Renaissance-style buildings, mostly built using the local light-coloured brick, adorn Veurne's central market square.  Among these are the city hall (Landhuis) and belfry, which was recognized by UNESCO as part of the Belfries of Belgium and France World Heritage Site in 1999 to highlight its historical importance in civic functions, use as a status symbol of the influence of the town, and architecture.
The nearby church of Saint Walburga is an example of the earlier Gothic style.
Other buildings of interest include the church of Saint Nicolas, the Spanish Pavilion, and the old meat market.
The castle of Beauvoorde on the outskirts of town, an old manor with a collection of 17th-century furniture.

Folklore
The annual Boeteprocessie (procession of the penitents) takes place every year on the last Sunday of July.  This unique event includes cross-carrying, hooded penitents and other groups of participants who recreate the Passion of Jesus.

Towns
The municipality of Veurne comprises 11 "deelgemeentes". Veurne proper is the largest centre and has the largest population. The others are small rural villages: Avekapelle, Booitshoeke, Bulskamp, De Moeren, Eggewaartskapelle, Houtem, Steenkerke, Vinkem, Wulveringem and Zoutenaaie. The municipality of Veurne has a total resident population of 11.701 (18/08/2015).

Source: official website city of Veurne

Veurne borders the following villages and municipalities:

a. Adinkerke (De Panne)
b. Koksijde (Koksijde)
c.  (Koksijde)
d.  (Nieuwpoort)
e. Pervijze (Diksmuide)
f. Lampernisse (Diksmuide)
g. Alveringem (Alveringem)
h. Oeren (Alveringem)
i. Izenberge (Alveringem)
j. Leisele (Alveringem)
k. Hondschoote (France)
l. Les Moëres (France)
m. Ghyvelde (France)

Notable people from Veurne
 Victor Boucquet (1619–1677), painter
  ( -1922), hero of the Battle of the Yser in World War I
 Paul Delvaux, surrealist painter, lived in Veurne for more than 20 years and died there.
 Edmond Hanssens (1843 – Vivi (Congo) 1884), explorer of Congo.
 Teresa of Portugal, Countess of Flanders around 1200, also died in Veurne.
 Will Tura, singer, musician, composer, and songwriter, was born in Veurne.

Honorary citizens
 King Albert I (1875–1934)
 Paul Delvaux (1897–1994)
 Frans Brouw (1929)
 Walter Plaetinck (1931)
 Will Tura (1940)
 Willem Vermandere (1940)

Twin city
 : Rösrath

References

External links

  
 

 
World Heritage Sites in Belgium